Félix Torres may refer to:

 Félix Torres Amat (1772-1849), Spanish bishop
 Félix Torres (baseball) (born 1932), Puerto Rican baseball player
 Félix Torres (footballer, born 1964), Paraguayan football striker
 Félix Torres (footballer, born 1997), Ecuadorian football defender